Pairi Daiza (formerly Paradisio) is a privately owned zoo and botanical garden located in Brugelette, Hainaut, Belgium. The  large animal theme park is located on the site of the former Cistercian Cambron Abbey, and is home to over 7,000 animals. The name is taken from the Avestan word pairi daēza, which is the source of the Persian word paradise.

Pairi Daiza is owned and operated by Pairi Daiza Belgium SA, a limited company previously listed on NYSE Alternext Brussels (code: PARD). It is a member of the European Association of Zoos and Aquaria (EAZA), and participates in the European Endangered Species Programme (EEP).

History

In 1148, Bernard, Abbot of Clairvaux (later Saint Bernard), sent twelve Cistercian monks to Cambron at the invitation of Anselm of Trazegnies, who had offered them land at the edge of the river Dender. After the abbey was dissolved, the family of the counts of the Val de Beaulieu purchased the property and built a castle, which remained in the family until purchased by the Domb family, who founded the park. The entire property has been a protected area since 1982.

The zoo was opened in 1993 as a bird garden named Paradisio. By 2000, the zoo included the Oasis, a large greenhouse that was home to other animals including meerkats, otters, and alligators. In 2001, the zoo opened the Nautilus (aquarium), the Madidi Islands (squirrel monkeys), and Nosy Komba (lemurs), followed by Algoa Bay (brown fur seals) in 2002.

The zoo created a series of suspension bridges in 2004 that let visitors see the exhibits from above. The "Dream of Han Wu Di" opened in 2006, and is the largest Chinese garden in Europe. A series of aviaries opened in 2007, showcasing raptors.

In 2009, the zoo opened the  "Kingdom of Ganesha," an Indonesian themed garden. It also changed its name to Pairi Daiza, which means "walled garden" or "orchard protected by walls"—the oldest name for paradise. Since April 2014, Pairi Daiza hosts a couple of two giant pandas that are on loan from China for 15 years.

Exhibits

Algoa Bay

Algoa Bay is home to the zoo's harbour seals and penguins. Visitors can watch the animals from above the water, or from an underwater viewing area where they may come face to face with residents of the exhibit.

The Nautilus

The Nautilus is an exhibit that is themed after 20,000 Leagues Under the Sea. It includes exhibits with coral reefs, lagoons, and tropical waters, and is home to sea urchins, starfish, anemones, crabs, and jellyfish. Visitors can touch the stingrays, and can watch sharks, moray eels, and sea turtles.

The Cathedral Aviary

One of the largest aviaries in Europe, this exhibit is home to birds including scarlet ibis, American flamingos, cattle egrets, hamerkops, storks, and vulturine guineafowl.

Mersus Emergo

The Mersus Emergo exhibit is a replica of the English whaling vessel Mersus Emergo that was used for 40 years, from 1870 to 1914. The exhibit opened in 2003 and includes the "SOS Biodiversity" exhibit, created in collaboration with the World Wildlife Fund (WWF), which highlights current threats to the planet and ways in which visitors can take action to help minimize these threats. The "ship" also includes the zoo's rescue center for animals such as pythons, boas, iguanas, turtles, and alligators that were handed over or abandoned by former owners who could no longer care for them. The lake and island surrounding the exhibit is home to shoebills.

The Oasis

This  greenhouse with waterfalls includes tropical plants such as bamboo, vines, banana trees, and hibiscus, and is home to animals including toucanets, bear cuscuses, dwarf mongoose, hornbills, and southern bald ibises.

Falconry Village

This attraction opened in 2007. There are several large aviaries for birds of prey including bald eagle, Steller's sea eagle, African fish eagle, Andean condor, kites, secretary bird, eagle-owl, and many types of caracaras and vultures. This part also features an enclosure for capybara, giant anteaters and lowland tapirs.

Tropicalia

A subtropical greenhouse, consisting of a Tropical Rainforest part and a desert part. In addition to enclosures for cottontop tamarin, toco toucan and Aldabra giant tortoises, it also has many free-ranging birds, including Cape thick-knee, lilac-breasted roller, African jacana, sunbittern and brown-hooded kingfisher.

La Terre du Froid (World of Cold)

This  area features not only enclosures for reindeer, Northern raccoons and American bison, but a Russian-themed restaurant, train museum and waterplane hangar as well.

Gardens

Chinese Garden

The Chinese garden, also called "The Dream of Han Wu Di," has been open since 2006. It is the largest Chinese garden in Europe, and in addition to its Chinese themed buildings, waterfalls, rocks, and plants, it is home to cranes, red pandas, and muntjak.

Kingdom of Ganesha

The  Kingdom of Ganesha, which was opened in 2009, is the largest Indonesian garden in Europe, and reproduces the plant life and feel of the Indonesian archipelago, particularly Bali. Its collections include Pura Agung Shanti Buwana Balinese Hindu temple, East Nusa Tenggara and Toraja traditional houses and miniature replicas of Borobudur and Prambanan temples. In August 2009 the Indonesian government has sent a pair of Sumatran elephants to enliven the Indonesian Park. It is the first endangered animal breeding loan program that Indonesia ever had in Europe.

Rose garden

Established in 2004, this rose garden is home to more than 700 varieties of roses from around the world, including rose bushes, climbing roses, vines, and rambling roses.

Andalusian garden

This garden near the park entrance is inspired by Moorish patios and the palaces of Spain. In addition to plants including ferns, fig trees, persimmons, and albizia, this garden includes many ponds and fountains.

Olive garden

The collection of plants in this garden was originally part of the Ghent Flower Show. The garden includes olive plants, fig trees, a cork oak, and a large patch of lavender which attracts butterflies.

Gallery

Other attractions 

A narrow gauge passenger train using historic steam locomotives circles a large part of the zoo. For a separate fee it gives visitors a view of many enclosures and animals including Asian elephants, hippopotamuses and American bison.

Notes

External links

Tourist attractions in Hainaut (province)
Zoos in Belgium
Buildings and structures in Hainaut (province)
Zoos established in 1993
1993 establishments in Belgium
Hindu temples in Europe
Balinese temples